Adolfo Grosso (17 December 1927 – 28 July 1980) was an Italian racing cyclist. He won stage 18 of the 1954 Giro d'Italia.

References

External links
 

1927 births
1980 deaths
Italian male cyclists
Italian Giro d'Italia stage winners
Place of birth missing
Cyclists from the Province of Treviso